Chaleun Yiapaoher (born 15 September 1951) is a Laotian lawyer and politician. He served as Minister of Justice of Laos.

References

Lao People's Revolutionary Party politicians
Laotian lawyers
Alternate members of the 4th Central Committee of the Lao People's Revolutionary Party
Members of the 5th Central Committee of the Lao People's Revolutionary Party
Members of the 6th Central Committee of the Lao People's Revolutionary Party
Members of the 7th Central Committee of the Lao People's Revolutionary Party
Members of the 8th Central Committee of the Lao People's Revolutionary Party
Members of the 9th Central Committee of the Lao People's Revolutionary Party
Members of the 10th Central Committee of the Lao People's Revolutionary Party
Members of the 11th Central Committee of the Lao People's Revolutionary Party
Justice ministers of Laos
Living people
Year of birth missing (living people)